The 2020–21 Alabama Crimson Tide men's basketball team represented the University of Alabama in the 2020–21 NCAA Division I men's basketball season. The team was led by second-year head coach Nate Oats. They played their home games at Coleman Coliseum in Tuscaloosa, Alabama as a member of the Southeastern Conference. The Crimson Tide won the regular season Southeastern Conference Championship, marking the team's first championship since 2002. They also won the SEC tournament, their first win in that competition since 1991 and the first time since 1987 that the program won both the regular season and tournament.

The Tide were placed as a No. 2 seed in the East Region for the 2021 NCAA tournament, their highest placement since 2002. They would defeat Iona and Maryland before falling to a surging 11-seed UCLA in the Sweet Sixteen in overtime, 88–78 (that UCLA team made the Final Four). Alabama was ranked No. 5 in the final Coaches' Poll following the season, and Oats was named SEC Coach of the Year as well as being a finalist for National Coach of the Year honors.

Previous season
The Crimson Tide finished the 2019–20 season 16–15, 8–10 in SEC play to finish in ninth place. They were set to take on Tennessee in the second round of the SEC tournament. However, the remainder of the SEC Tournament was cancelled amid the start of the COVID-19 pandemic.

Offseason

Departures

Incoming transfers

2021 recruiting class

Preseason

SEC media poll
The SEC media poll was released on November 12, 2020.

Preseason All-SEC teams
The Crimson Tide had one player selected to the preseason all-SEC teams.

First Team

John Petty Jr.

Roster

Schedule and results

|-
!colspan=12 style=|Non-conference regular season

|-
!colspan=12 style=|SEC regular season

|-
!colspan=12 style=|  SEC Tournament

|-
!colspan=12 style=| NCAA tournament

Rankings

*AP does not release post-NCAA Tournament rankings^Coaches did not release a Week 1 poll.

References    

Alabama
Alabama Crimson Tide men's basketball seasons
Alabama Crimson Tide
Alabama Crimson Tide
Alabama